The Qahir class is a class of two corvettes designed and built by VT Group in the United Kingdom for the Royal Navy of Oman. The hull and superstructure has been designed with features including the cladding of surfaces with radar absorbent material and angled sides to reduce the radar cross section.

Ships in Class
Oman placed an order for two corvettes from Vosper Thornycroft as part of Project Muheet on 5 April 1992, work beginning in September 1992. The two ships were completed in 1996, with the final ship, Al Mua'zzar being delivered to Oman and commissioned in 1997.

See also

 Khareef-class corvette

Notes and references

External links 
 Image

Corvettes of the Royal Navy of Oman
Corvettes of the United Kingdom
Ships built in Southampton
1996 ships
Corvettes of Oman
Corvette classes